Lucente is an Italian surname. Notable people with this surname include:
Iluminado Lucente (1883-1960), Filipino writer
Sam Lucente (born 1958), American designer
Vito Lucente (born 1971), Italian DJ

References

Italian-language surnames